Events in the year 1701 in Norway.

Incumbents
Monarch: Frederick IV

Events

Arts and literature

Births

23 September – Bredo von Munthe af Morgenstierne, civil servant, Supreme Court justice and landowner (died 1757).

Full date missing
Simen Fougner, farmer and writer (died 1783).

Deaths

See also

References